Gornje Selo, which translates as  Upper Village from Serbo-Croatian, may refer to:

 Gornje Selo, Split-Dalmatia County, Croatia
 Gornje Selo, Montenegro
 Gornje Selo, Zavidovići, Bosnia and Herzegovina